Jaye Lawrence Chapman (born May 22, 1987) is an American former professional baseball pitcher. He played in Major League Baseball (MLB) for the Chicago Cubs.

Career

Atlanta Braves
Chapman was drafted by the Atlanta Braves in the 16th round of the 2005 MLB Draft out of A. Crawford Mosley High School in Lynn Haven, Florida. He played for Jed Douglas. The Braves added him to the 40 man roster after the 2011 season to protect him from the Rule 5 draft.

Chicago Cubs
Chapman was traded to the Chicago Cubs with Arodys Vizcaíno for Reed Johnson and Paul Maholm in July 2012.

Chapman made his major league debut on September 4, 2012, against the Washington Nationals.

Bridgeport Bluefish
Chapman signed with the Bridgeport Bluefish of the Atlantic League for the 2014 season. He pitched to a 2–3 record with a 3.86 ERA in 50 games for the Bluefish.

Milwaukee Brewers
On November 15, 2014, Chapman was signed to a minor league deal by the Milwaukee Brewers.

He was invited to spring training by the Milwaukee Brewers for the 2016 season.

Tampa Bay Rays
He was traded to the Tampa Bay Rays on July 10, 2016.

Texas Rangers
He was released by the Texas Rangers on July 13, 2017.

References

External links

1987 births
Living people
Chicago Cubs players
Danville Braves players
Rome Braves players
Myrtle Beach Pelicans players
Mississippi Braves players
Gwinnett Braves players
Iowa Cubs players
Tennessee Smokies players
Bridgeport Bluefish players
People from Panama City, Florida
Baseball players from Florida
Biloxi Shuckers players
Águilas Cibaeñas players
American expatriate baseball players in the Dominican Republic
Major League Baseball pitchers